"Unify" is the song written and performed by American hip hop recording artists Kid Capri, Snoop Dogg and Slick Rick. It was recorded at Larrabee Studio in Los Angeles, at Bearsville Studio in Bearsville and at The Hit Factory in New York City, and released in 1998 through Track Masters/Columbia Records as the only single from Kid Capri's sophomore studio album Soundtrack to the Streets. It was produced by Kid Capri himself, and contains a sample from "One Mint Julep" written by Rudy Toombs. Its remix version was produced by Poke & Tone, and contains portions of "Good Times" written by Bernard Edwards and Nile Rodgers.

The song peaked at #13 on the Bubbling Under Hot 100, at #24 on the Hot Rap Songs, at #57 on the Hot R&B/Hip-Hop Singles Sales, at #62 on the Hot R&B/Hip-Hop Songs of the Billboard charts in the United States. It was also included in Slick Rick's 1999 album The Art of Storytelling.

Track listing

Personnel 

 David Anthony Love, Jr. – vocals, producer (tracks: 1-3)
 Richard Martin Lloyd Walters – vocals
 Calvin Cordozar Broadus Jr. – vocals
 Jean-Claude Olivier – producer (tracks: 4-7)
 Samuel Barnes – producer (tracks: 4-7)
 D'Anthony – engineering (tracks: 1-3)
 Ben Garrison – engineering (tracks: 4-7)
 Kevin Crouse – mixing
 Tom Coyne – mastering

Charts

References

External links 

 

1998 songs
1998 singles
Hip hop songs
Slick Rick songs
Snoop Dogg songs
Columbia Records singles
Songs written by Slick Rick
Songs written by Snoop Dogg
Songs written by Rudy Toombs